Pseudodiacantha macklottii, formally Orxines macklottii, is a species of stick insect endemic to Java. It is better known as the Javanese Lichen Stick Insect due to their habit of covering their bodies with moss and lichens to supplement their disguise in the wild.

Description
They are long-legged and slender and less contrasting than females. Both sexes have small bright orange wings, fringed with a black border and white dots, but lack flight capability.

Captivity
The first culture of Pseudodiacantha macklottii was imported by a zoo in London in 1946 but the exact origin of this old culture is unknown. They are considered easy to breed. Common food plants accepted by both nymphs and adults include Corylus avellana and Rhododendron. Pseudodiacantha macklottii are active mainly during the night and when threatened, they release a distinctive odor.

Additional images

References

External links
Phasmid Study Group

Phasmatodea
Phasmatodea of Asia
Insects described in 1842